Northcote is a hotel and restaurant in a 19th-century manor house in Langho, Lancashire, England. The restaurant has held a Michelin star since the 1996 Michelin Guide. Executive Head Chef Lisa Goodwin-Allen focuses on "local dishes based on regional ingredients".

The hotel was named AA Hotel of the Year — England 2016–17, and VisitEngland Hotel of the Year 2017.

References

External links
 

Restaurants in Lancashire
Michelin Guide starred restaurants in the United Kingdom
Tourist attractions in Ribble Valley
Buildings and structures in Ribble Valley
Hotels in Lancashire
Houses in Lancashire